The 1997–98 season of the Jupiler League was held between August 8, 1997, and May 10, 1998. Club Brugge became champions.

Promoted teams

These teams were promoted from the second division at the start of the season:
Beveren (second division champions)
Westerlo (playoff winner)

Relegated teams
These teams were relegated to the second division at the end of the season:
RWDM
Antwerp

Brugge's title success
Club Brugge ended in first place 18 points ahead of Racing Genk.

Battle for Europe
Sporting Anderlecht finally qualified for the UEFA Cup by ending in 4th place as Genk (2nd) and Brugge (1st) played the Cup final.  The third team to qualify for the UEFA Cup was Germinal Ekeren (3rd).

The relegation dog fight
RWDM was relegated following a 1-1 draw at Charleroi as the newcomer Beveren managed to draw against Germinal Ekeren on the 33rd matchday.  With 4 points more than RWDM the club from Waasland then lost to Anderlecht on the last matchday whereas RWDM easily beat Lokeren by 5-1.

Final league table

Results

Top goal scorers

See also
1997–98 in Belgian football

References
 Sport.be website – Archive

Belgian Pro League seasons
Belgian
1997–98 in Belgian football